New River Valley Airport  is two miles north of Dublin, in Pulaski County, Virginia. It is owned by the New River Valley Airport Commission.

The facility serves general aviation and is a U.S. Customs Service port of entry as of 2006.

The airport was dedicated on June 3, 1962, and Piedmont Airlines was a founding user; their last YS-11 left in 1972.

Facilities
Its single runway, 6/24, is 6,201 by 150 feet (1,890 x 46 m) asphalt.

In the year ending July 31, 2006 the airport had 10,044 aircraft operations, average 27 per day: 62% general aviation and 38% military. 34 aircraft were then based at the airport: 78% single-engine, 19% multi-engine and 3% helicopter.

References

External links 
 
 

Airports in Virginia
Buildings and structures in Pulaski County, Virginia
Transportation in Pulaski County, Virginia
Airports established in 1962
1962 establishments in Virginia